Tashbulatovo (Taşbulat) is a rural locality (a selo) and the administrative center of Tashbulatovsky Selsoviet, Abzelilovsky District, Bashkortostan, Russia. The population was 1,277 as of 2010. There are 20 streets.

Geography 
Tashbulatovo is located 48 km north of Askarovo (the district's administrative centre) by road. Geologorazvedka is the nearest rural locality.

References 

Rural localities in Abzelilovsky District